Scott D. Strausbaugh (born July 23, 1963 in York, Pennsylvania) is an American slalom canoeist who competed in the late 1980s and early 1990s. He won a gold medal in the C2 event at the 1992 Summer Olympics in Barcelona, partnering Joe Jacobi.

World Cup individual podiums

References
 

1963 births
Living people
American male canoeists
Canoeists at the 1992 Summer Olympics
Olympic gold medalists for the United States in canoeing
Sportspeople from York, Pennsylvania
Olympic medalists in canoeing
Medalists at the 1992 Summer Olympics